Cnemidophorus is a genus of lizards in the family Teiidae. Species in the genus Cnemidophorus are commonly referred to as whiptail lizards or racerunners.  The genus is endemic to South America, Central America, and the West Indies.

Taxonomy
Reeder et al. (2002) re-examined the nomenclature for the genus Cnemidophorus (sensu lato) and split it into the two genera Aspidoscelis and Cnemidophorus (sensu stricto). A further split by Harvey et al. (2012) added the genera Ameivula and Contomastix.

Etymology

Reproduction
In some of the Cnemidophorus species, there are no males, and they reproduce through parthenogenesis. This is well known in bees and aphids, but is very rare in vertebrates. Those species without males are now known to originate through hybridization, or interspecific breeding. Occasionally, a mating between a female of one species and a male of another produces a parthenogen, a female that is able to produce viable eggs that are genetically identical to her own cells.  The lizards that hatch from these eggs are thus also parthenogens that can again produce identical eggs, resulting in an asexual, clonal population. Parthenogenetic species resulting from a single hybridization are diploid (that is, they have two sets of chromosomes   just as sexual species do), but sometimes these females mate with other males, producing offspring which are triploid (that is, they have three sets of chromosomes, or 50% more than equivalent sexual species; see polyploidy). Over 30% of the genus Cnemidophorus are parthenogenic.

Species
The genus Cnemidophorus (sensu stricto) contains the following species which are recognized as being valid.
Cnemidophorus arenivagus 
Cnemidophorus arubensis  - Aruba whiptail
Cnemidophorus cryptus  - cryptic racerunner
Cnemidophorus duellmani 
Cnemidophorus espeuti 
Cnemidophorus flavissimus 
Cnemidophorus gaigei  - Gaige's rainbow lizard
Cnemidophorus gramivagus 
Cnemidophorus lemniscatus  - rainbow whiptail
Cnemidophorus leucopsammus 
Cnemidophorus murinus  - Laurent's whiptail
Cnemidophorus nigricolor 
Cnemidophorus pseudolemniscatus  - Colee's racerunner
Cnemidophorus rostralis 
Cnemidophorus ruatanus 
Cnemidophorus ruthveni 
Cnemidophorus senectus 
Cnemidophorus splendidus  - blue rainbow lizard
Cnemidophorus vanzoi  - Saint Lucia whiptail, Vanzo's whiptail

Nota bene: A binomial authority in parentheses indicates that the species was originally described in a genus other than Cnemidophorus.

See also

 Aspidoscelis
 Darevskia, another lizard genus containing several parthenogenic species.

References

3. “Western Whiptail Lizard.” Whiptail Lizard - Desert Wildlife, digital-desert.com/wildlife/whiptail-lizard.html

Further reading
Harvey, Michael B.; Ugueto, Gabriel N.; Gutberlet, Ronald L. (2012). "Review of Teiid Morphology with a Revised Taxonomy and Phylogeny of the Teiidae (Lepidosauria: Squamata)". Zootaxa 3459: 1-156.
Wagler J (1830). Natürliches System der AMPHIBIEN, mit vorangehender Classification der SÄUGTHIERE und VÖGEL. Ein Beitrag zur vergleichenden Zoologie. Munich, Stuttgart and Tübingen: J.G. Cotta. vi + 354 pp. + one plate. (Cnemidophorus, new genus, p. 154). (in German and Latin).

External links
 Cnemidophorus deppei and other lizards of Laguna de Apoyo Nature Reserve, Nicaragua
 Reeder, Tod W.; Dessauer, Herbert C.; Cole, Charles J. (2002). Phylogenetic relationships of whiptail lizards of the genus Cnemidophorus (Squamata, Teiidae): a test of monophyly, reevaluation of karyotypic evolution, and review of hybrid origins. American Museum Novitates (3365): 1-61. 

 
Lizard genera
Taxa named by Johann Georg Wagler